The 43rd Grey Cup game was played on November 26, 1955, before 39,417 football fans at Empire Stadium in Vancouver. This was the first Grey Cup played in Vancouver.

The Edmonton Eskimos  beat Montreal Alouettes by the score of 34–19.

Box Score 

First Quarter

Montreal - Single - Bud Korchak missed field goal
Edmonton – TD – Normie Kwong 1-yard run (Bob Dean convert)
Montreal – TD – Pat Abbruzzi 1-yard run (Bud Korchak convert)
Montreal – TD – Hal Patterson 41-yard pass from Sam Etcheverry (Bud Korchak convert)

Second Quarter

Edmonton – TD – Johnny Bright 42-yard run (Bob Dean convert)
Montreal – TD – Hal Patterson 15-yard pass from Sam Etcheverry (Bud Korchak convert)
Edmonton – TD – Bob Heydenfeldt 15-yard pass from Jackie Parker (Bob Dean convert)

Third Quarter

Edmonton – TD – Normie Kwong 1-yard run (Bob Dean convert)
Edmonton – TD – Johnny Bright 3-yard run (Bob Dean convert)

Fourth Quarter

Edmonton – Single – Bob Dean missed field goal
Edmonton – FG – Bob Dean 20-yard field goal

Trivia 
This was the last professional Canadian football game with touchdowns valued at five points - the value of this scoring play was changed to six points, thus making it identical with that of its long-standing value in American football, prior to the start of the following season.

Montreal Alouettes quarterback Sam Etcheverry set a Grey Cup record with 508 passing yards. Normie Kwong rushed 30 times for 145 yards for Edmonton.

The game was held in Vancouver for the first time, and outside of Ontario for only the second time. The attendance was a record that would last until 1976.

This was the second of 11 Grey Cup clashes between Edmonton and Montreal. The Eskimos have won in 1954, 1955, 1956, 1975, 1978, 1979, 2003 and 2005's overtime thriller. The Larks have prevailed in 1974, the Ice Bowl of 1977, and 2002.

External links 
 
 film of the 1955 Grey Cup Parade

Grey Cup
Grey Cup
Grey Cups hosted in Vancouver
1955 in British Columbia
Montreal Alouettes
Edmonton Elks
1950s in Vancouver
1955 in Canadian television
November 1955 sports events in Canada